Nejat Saydam (15 September 1929 – 25 October 2000) was a Turkish film director, screenwriter and actor from Istanbul. He began as a theater actor in 1946 and became an assistant in movies four years later. In 1957, he began directing films. Saydam starred in two Turkish films and wrote 85 film scripts.

External links
 
 Nejat Saydam at Sinema Türk

1929 births
2000 deaths
Turkish male stage actors
Turkish film directors
Turkish male screenwriters
Turkish male film actors
20th-century Turkish male actors
20th-century screenwriters
Burials at Aşiyan Asri Cemetery